Torpids is one of two series of bumping races, a type of rowing race, held yearly at Oxford University; the other is Eights Week. Over 130 men's and women's crews race for their colleges in six men's divisions and five women's; almost 1,200 participants in total. The racing takes place on the Isis (part of the River Thames), usually in the 7th week of Hilary Term on four successive days from Wednesday to Saturday (around the start of March).

Overview

Bumping races evolved in Oxford as the river is too narrow for normal side by side racing. Competing crews start the race lined up in order, one behind another, with their coxes holding ropes ('bung lines') attached to the bank, with gaps of about 1.5 boat lengths between the bow of one boat and the stern of the one in front. Racing is started by the firing of a cannon.Racing is by division, the number of crews in a division depending on river conditions. The bottom men's division starts first with men's and women's alternating, finishing with the top women's division.  

Crews attempt to progress up their division by hitting ('bumping') the boat in front without being hit by the boat behind, with the ultimate aim of becoming "Head Of The River" i.e. top of the first division. The Head of the River is awarded the Torpids Challenge Cup, presented to the OUBC by President T.C. Edwards-Moss of Brasenose College Boat Club. Once a bump has taken place, the crew whose boat was bumped has to continue racing (and is liable to be bumped again) whilst the bumping crew moves to the side. This can lead to a crew moving down several places during a day's racing. This is the principal difference in the rules between Torpids and Summer Eights, where both crews stop racing. Commonly a cox will concede a bump, signalled by raising an arm, rather than waiting to be hit. The crew finishing top of a lower division rows again the same day at the bottom of the division above.

The name 'Torpids' derives from the event's origins as a race for the second boats of the colleges, which were of course slower than the first boats. The status of the event - still adjudged below that of Summer Eights on account of the absence of rowers in the varsity boat races - only began to rise at the very end of the nineteenth century, when colleges began to form first boats to compete. Nowadays there is no limit on the number of boats a college may enter, although crews in the last two divisions and crews without a position have to qualify to race by competing in a timed race the preceding Friday, known as 'rowing on'.

Athletes competing in that year's Boat Race, Women's Boat Race or any of the Lightweight University crews at Henley Boat Races may not compete in Torpids, but may compete in Summer Eights.

Double Headship

The 'Double Headship' is an accolade of any college finishing with their men's and women's crews at the 'Head of the River'.  Oriel is the first to have achieved this in Torpids, in 2006. The college's new first crews repeated this in 2018.

Trophies
The first day's starting order is based on the previous year's finishing positions, and each subsequent day's starting order is based on the previous day's finishing positions. A crew that bumps on every day or that finishes at the Head of the River is awarded blades - the right to get trophy oars painted up in their college colours with the names and weights of the successful crew emblazoned on them. Spoons are awarded in case the crew was bumped on every single day. A third, somewhat unusual possibility is the award of spades. The crew is both bumped and then proceeds to bump a crew in front of it before the end of the race. Thus being both the bumper and the bumped on the same day. Owing to the differences in rules between Torpids and Lent Bumps at the University of Cambridge this achievement is only possible at Oxford.

Head of the River - Summary table

Men's Head of Torpids
Torpids has been held since 1838. The following gives the colleges that were Head of the River (Head of Torpids) in these years.

Women's Head of Torpids
Women's division in Torpids have existed since 1978. This was delayed from 1977 when the river was flooded and Torpids was cancelled.

See also
 Eights Week, a similar event in summer
 Lent Bumps, the equivalent event in Cambridge

References

External links
 Torpids results
 Oxford Bumps Charts

1838 establishments in England
Recurring sporting events established in 1838
Regattas on the River Thames
Rowing at the University of Oxford
March events
Events in Oxford
Annual events in England
Annual sporting events in the United Kingdom
Christ Church Meadow, Oxford
Bumps races